William Allan Reid (11 October 1865 – 17 March 1952) was a British Conservative Party politician, who served as one of the two Members of Parliament (MPs) for Derby from the 1931 general election until the 1945 general election.

References

External links 
 

1865 births
1952 deaths
Conservative Party (UK) MPs for English constituencies
Members of the Parliament of the United Kingdom for constituencies in Derbyshire
UK MPs 1931–1935
UK MPs 1935–1945